Matteo Contini (born 16 April 1980) is an Italian football coach and former defender.

Playing career

Milan
He started his professional career in the A.C. Milan youth system. He was then farmed to Serie C1 teams Livorno (loan), SPAL (loan), Monza (co-ownership) and L'Aquila (co-ownership) between 1999–2003 and Serie B team Avellino in 2003–04 Serie B season.

Parma
His 50% registration rights was bought by Parma in 2004 for €180,000 fee that became full ownership in 2005 for an additional fee of €400,000. Contini played for Parma in 2004–05 UEFA Cup and 2006–07 UEFA Cup.

Napoli
In 2007, he was signed by S.S.C. Napoli for €3.2 million. Contini played for Napoli in Serie A as well as in Italian Cup, 2008 UEFA Intertoto Cup and 2008–09 UEFA Cup.

Zaragoza 
On 27 January 2010 Contini was loaned to Real Zaragoza with option to purchase.

On 8 July 2010, Zaragoza made the purchase option, for €2 million and signed Contini on a three-year deal.

Siena
On 8 August 2011, after a year and a half in Spain, he returned to Italy, taken from Siena on a season-long loan for €300,000 with option to buy the registration rights. Contini wore no.80 shirt for 2011–12 Serie A. In July 2012, Contini signed a permanent deal with Siena, which the club declared the total cost including misc cost was €1,374,239. He signed a 2-year contract. Contini changed to wear no.22 in 2012–13 Serie A.

Atalanta
Six months after joining Siena definitively, he joined Atalanta for €1 million in an initial -year contract. Contini kept to use no.22 shirt for "blue-black". On 30 August 2013, he went on loan to Juve Stabia.

In the next 3 seasons, he was loaned to Bari (twice) and Ternana.

He retired in 2018 after a season with Serie D amateurs Pergolettese.

Coaching career
After his retirement, he stayed at Pergolettese as a youth coach. On 6 November 2018 he was promoted head coach of the Serie D club, and guided his club to promotion to Serie C by the end of the season. He was dismissed on 12 November 2019 after the club started their Serie C season with 5 draws and 9 losses in the first 14 games. He was re-hired by Pergolettese on 19 June 2020. He resigned from Pergolettese on 15 November 2020.

On 11 November 2021, he was hired by Serie C club Giana Erminio. After suffering relegation to Serie D following to a 2–4 aggregate loss Trento in the playoffs, on 27 May 2022 Giana Erminio announced Contini's departure from the club.

References

External links
Lega Serie A profile 

AIC profile (data by football.it)  

Italian footballers
Italian football managers
Serie C managers
A.C. Milan players
U.S. Livorno 1915 players
S.P.A.L. players
U.S. Avellino 1912 players
A.C. Monza players
L'Aquila Calcio 1927 players
Parma Calcio 1913 players
S.S.C. Napoli players
Real Zaragoza players
A.C.N. Siena 1904 players
Atalanta B.C. players
S.S. Juve Stabia players
S.S.C. Bari players
Ternana Calcio players
U.S. Pergolettese 1932 players
La Liga players
Serie A players
Serie B players
Serie C players
Serie D players
Italian expatriate footballers
Expatriate footballers in Spain
Italian expatriate sportspeople in Spain
Association football defenders
Sportspeople from the Province of Varese
1980 births
Living people
Footballers from Lombardy